Youssef Fennich (born 12 February 1993 in the Netherlands) is a Dutch retired footballer.

Career

In 2011/12, Fennich won the youth league and reached the finals of the youth cup as well as that year's NextGen Series with A.F.C. Ajax, the most successful team in the Netherlands.

In 2012, he joined fellow Dutch side SC Heerenveen, where he failed to make an appearance.

After making one appearance with PEC Zwolle in the Dutch top flight, Fennich signed for Azerbaijani outfit Keşla FK, where he again failed to make an appearance.

In 2017, he signed for Moroccan club Chabab Rif Al Hoceima before sealing a move to Mouloudia Oujda in the same country the following season.

References

External links
 Youssef Fennich at Footballdatabase.eu

Dutch footballers
Living people
1993 births
Association football midfielders
PEC Zwolle players
Footballers from Amsterdam